Animal sexes may refer to:

 Animal sexual behaviour, sexuality and sexual activities within animal species
 Canine reproduction, the process of sexual reproduction in domestic dogs
 Animal husbandry, a branch of agriculture concerned with the day-to-day care, selective breeding, and raising of livestock
 Selective breeding, the process by which humans develop particular traits in domesticated species by choosing which individuals reproduce
 Sexing, determining the sex of animals in a farm or zoological context
 Stud farm, an establishment for selective breeding of livestock
 Zoophilia or bestiality, sex between humans and animals